The Nokia Talkman 620 is a portable phone which is discontinued.

Functions 

 Power signal received from the base station network
 Keyboard and display lighting
 Duration of the call (call)
 Auto power off function
 Volume control keyboard signals
 Adjustable keyboard sound
 Check the remaining battery
 8Transmitter power control
 Selection of country code
 Set the block level
 Transfer call to another handset
 Pause
 Memory
 Multi-part transmission in the NMT system
 Last number redial
 Lock keypad
 Clear Display
 Select characters during conversation
 Display angle settings

References 

Talkman 620